Colletotrichum arachidis is a plant pathogen.

References

External links

arachidis
Fungal plant pathogens and diseases
Fungi described in 1959